In mathematics, specifically in order theory and functional analysis, a locally convex vector lattice (LCVL) is a topological vector lattice that is also a locally convex space. 
LCVLs are important in the theory of topological vector lattices.

Lattice semi-norms 

The Minkowski functional of a convex, absorbing, and solid set is a called a lattice semi-norm. 
Equivalently, it is a semi-norm  such that  implies  
The topology of a locally convex vector lattice is generated by the family of all continuous lattice semi-norms.

Properties 

Every locally convex vector lattice possesses a neighborhood base at the origin consisting of convex balanced solid absorbing sets. 

If a locally convex vector lattice is barreled then its strong dual space is complete (this is not necessarily true if the space is merely a locally convex barreled space but not a locally convex vector lattice). 

Every reflexive locally convex vector lattice is order complete and a complete locally convex TVS whose strong dual is a barreled reflexive locally convex TVS that can be identified under the canonical evaluation map with the strong bidual (that is, the strong dual of the strong dual). 

If a locally convex vector lattice  is an infrabarreled TVS then it can be identified under the evaluation map with a topological vector sublattice of its strong bidual, which is an order complete locally convex vector lattice under its canonical order.

If  is a locally convex vector lattice that is bornological and sequentially complete, then there exists a family of compact spaces  and a family of -indexed vector lattice embeddings  such that  is the finest locally convex topology on  making each  continuous.

Examples 

Every Banach lattice, normed lattice, and Fréchet lattice is a locally convex vector lattice.

See also

References

Bibliography

  
  

Functional analysis